The Irvine Grade School, at 229 Broadway in Irvine, Kentucky, was built in 1920.  It was listed on the National Register of Historic Places in 2000.

It is a two-story Mission Style brick school building.

The property was left by the Estill County School District in 1998 which moved the Irvine Elementary School to a new building elsewhere.  In 2000, the building was being "rehabilitated for use as senior citizen apartments and a community center by AU Associates of Lexington, Kentucky."

References

Public elementary schools in Kentucky
National Register of Historic Places in Estill County, Kentucky
Mission Revival architecture in Kentucky
School buildings completed in 1920
1920 establishments in Kentucky
School buildings on the National Register of Historic Places in Kentucky